Zadornyy was a Project 1135 Burevestnik-class guard ship or Krivak-class frigate that served with the Soviet and Russian Navies. Displacing  full load, the vessel was built around the Metel anti-submarine missile system. Zadornyy was launched on 25 March 1979 in Leningrad, the last of the class to be built by the A.A. Zhdanov shipyard, and served with the Northern Fleet. After taking part in exercises Avangard-81, Sever-81 and Okean-83, and cruising as far as Havana, Cuba, the vessel was upgraded between 11 June 1990 and 23 May 1995 with missiles that added anti-ship capability. After more than twenty-five years service, the ship was decommissioned on 3 December 2005.

Design and development
Designed by N.P. Sobolov, Zadornyy was one of twenty-one Project 1135 Burevestnik ("Petrel") class ships launched between 1970 and 1981. Project 1135 was envisaged by the Soviet Navy as a less expensive complement to the Project 1134A Berkut A (NATO reporting name 'Kresta II') and Project 1134B Berkut B (NATO reporting name 'Kara') classes of anti-submarine warfare ships. The design was originally given to TsKB-340, which had designed the earlier Project 159 (NATO reporting name 'Petya') and Project 35 (NATO reporting name 'Mirka') classes. However, the expansion in the United States Navy ballistic missile submarine fleet and the introduction of longer-ranged and more accurate submarine-launched ballistic missiles led to a revisit of the project. The work was transferred to TsKB-53 in Leningrad who produced a substantially larger and more capable design. However, Zadornyy retained the same Guard Ship (SKR) designation as the smaller vessels, reflecting the Soviet strategy of creating protected areas for friendly ballistic missile submarines close to the coast. NATO forces called the new vessels Krivak-class frigates.

Power was provided by two M7 sets, each consisting of a combination of a  DK59 and a  M62 gas turbine combined in a COGAG installation and driving one fixed-pitch propeller. The ship’s complement was 197, including 23 officers.

Armament and sensors
Zadornyy initially had a primary mission of anti-submarine warfare and for this end was equipped with four URPK-3 Metel missiles (NATO reporting name SS-N-14 Silex), backed up by two quadruple torpedo tube mounts for  torpedoes and a pair of  RBU-6000 Smerch-2 anti-submarine rocket launchers.  The main armament was upgraded to URPK-5 Rastrub (SS-N-14B) missiles to add anti-shipping capability between 11 June 1990 and 23 May 1995. Defence against aircraft was provided by forty 4K33 OSA-M (SA-N-4 'Gecko') surface-to-air missiles which were launched from two sets of ZIF-122 launchers, each capable of launching two missiles. Two twin  AK-726 guns were mounted aft and two single mounts for  21-KM guns were carried on the superstructure. Provision was made for carrying 18 mines.

Zadornyy had a well-equipped sensor suite, including a single MR-310A Angara-A air/surface search radar, Volga  and Don-2 navigation radars, the MP-401S Start-S ESM radar system and the Spectrum-F laser warning system. An extensive sonar complex was fitted, including MG-332 Titan-2, which was mounted in a bow radome, and MG-325 Vega. The ship was also equipped with the PK-16 decoy-dispenser system.

Construction and career
Named for the Russian word for Provocative, Zadornyy served with the Soviet Navy, and the Russian Navy after the dissolution of the Soviet Union, as an anti-submarine frigate. The vessel was laid down by the A.A. Zhdanov shipyard in Leningrad on 10 November 1977, the last of the class to be constructed by the shipbuilder, and was given the yard number 716. Launched on 25 March 1979 and commissioned on 31 August, the vessel was accepted into the Northern Fleet on 13 September the same year as part of the 10th Brigade.

Serving in the anti-submarine warfare role, Zadornyy started the new decade involved in the Avangard-81, Sever-81 and Okean-83 fleet exercises. These increasingly demonstrated the Soviet ability to operate as a blue-water navy. As part of operations in the Atlantic Ocean, Caribbean Sea and Mediterranean Sea, the ship visited Havana, Cuba, between 28 December 1984 and 2 January 1985, and Algiers, Algeria, between 2 and 6 May 1985. The Cuban visit was repeated between 3 and 7 November 1988 when Zadornyy returned to Havana along with the Large Anti-Submarine Ship (BPK)  and Project 641B submarine B-215.

With the dissolution of the Soviet Union on 26 December 1991, the ship was transferred to the Russian Navy and, in 1996, took part in the Navy's Tricentennial at Arkhangelsk. Soon afterwards, on 3 December 2005, the ship was decommissioned. The flag was finally lowered on 6 February 2006 and the ship sold to be broken up on 16 August 2006.

References

Citations

Bibliography

 
 
 
 
 
 
 

1979 ships
Krivak-class frigates of the Russian Navy
Ships built at Severnaya Verf
Ships built in the Soviet Union
Cold War frigates of the Soviet Union